Lameck Siame (born 9 July 1997) is a Zambian football goalkeeper who plays for [[.Zanaco]
].

References

1997 births
Living people
Zambian footballers
Zambia international footballers
Kabwe Warriors F.C. players
Zanaco F.C. players
Association football goalkeepers
Zambia A' international footballers
2020 African Nations Championship players